Flavius Paulus (Greek: Παύλος fl. 496) was a politician of the Eastern Roman Empire.

Family 
Paulus was the brother of Anastasius I. His family was Illyrian, and he was the son of Pompeius (born ), a nobleman from Dyrrachium, and Anastasia Constantina (born ), an Arian and a paternal great-granddaughter of the Roman caesar Constantius Gallus and his wife, Constantina (the daughter of Roman emperor Constantine the Great).

Life
In 496 he was appointed consul without colleague. He married Magna; they had a daughter, Irene, who married Olybrius, a member of the House of Theodosius.

References

 Brian Croke, Count Marcellinus and his chronicle, Oxford University Press, 2001, p. 89.

5th-century Byzantine people
5th-century Roman consuls
Illyrian people
Imperial Roman consuls
Year of birth unknown
Year of death unknown